Park Chi-ho (born 15 September 1972) is a South Korean wrestler. He competed in the men's Greco-Roman 57 kg at the 1996 Summer Olympics.

References

1972 births
Living people
South Korean male sport wrestlers
Olympic wrestlers of South Korea
Wrestlers at the 1996 Summer Olympics
Place of birth missing (living people)